Wizadora is a children's television programme created by Don Arioli and Carolyne Cullum. It was originally broadcast on SWR in 1991 and it was used as an English-language learning tool for non-English speakers. In 1993, the series was picked up by ITV in the United Kingdom.

Development
A pilot show starred Fawlty Towers writer and actress Connie Booth, who had been alerted to the character by John Cleese who had taken an interest in the production. The pilot was never broadcast.

The concept was then developed into a language teaching tool for children to learn the English language published by Oxford University Press in 1991. Books, audio, and media were produced alongside the series. Originally the title role of Wizadora was initially played by Connie Booth in an unaired pilot before Maria Gough played the title role for Oxford University Press. Cathy Lawday was the writer and editor of the books and media produced for Oxford.

In 1992, Meridian Broadcasting took up the series. Considerable changes were made for this series. Some major changes included the introduction of Wendy van der Plank as Wizadora, who remained as the character from 1993 to 1996. Lizzie McPhee took over the role in 1997 until the series end. Tatty, who was originally played by a woman (Debbie Cumming), was now played by a man (Joe Greco 1993–94, Steven Ryde 1994–98) and Phoebe, who was originally played by actor Emma Amos, was re-introduced as a "life-sized" model. Many characters were introduced and the original characters were given a makeover. Connie Booth was brought back in to write episodes for the series among others.

Characters 
 Wizadora – the title character, a trainee wizard who receives her magic wand in the pilot episode, who initially has problems getting her spells right. Some of the things in Wizadora's kitchen are able to talk due to stray spells. Wizadora often breaks the fourth wall and talks to the viewers and usually asks for their help when casting her spells. Wizadora's catchphrases include "Oh, botheration!" and "Time for a bit of Wizzification!".

Wizadora's companions included –
 Tatty Bogle – a dim-witted scarecrow who lives in Wizadora's back garden and continually gets words muddled up. The character was played by a woman before being reintroduced as a man for ITV. Played in the ITV series by Joe Greco(1993) and Steven Ryde (1994–1997). Ryde was the voice-over announcer between programmes for the CITV service during the same period.
 Stan the Shopkeeper. He regularly takes delivery of new magical catalogue items and is very cautious of Wizadora's spells. Played by Brian Murphy
 Pippa the Postwoman. She rides a bike on her rounds and ofter becomes tired. Played by Tessa Hatts
 Top/Sticky/Bottom – three talking drawer people, who resemble socks. Once described as "a real nuisance" by Wizadora, they are very naughty, usually teasing Hangle and/or Filbert, and are always attempting to steal food or getting up to some kind of mischief whenever Wizadora's back is turned. Their antics usually end up causing much trouble; one time Top invented a Grub Grabber to try and steal some food, but the device frightened Filbert who accidentally knocked over some potions, some of which got into Very Old Fish's tank and turned him into a purple blob. Wizadora usually punishes them by zapping them back into their drawers with her wand.
 Phoebe – a talking telephone. Early in the series, actor Emma Amos was dressed in a pink costume to play the role. In the ITV series Phoebe was re-introduced as a 'life-sized' model telephone, pink with a yellow headset, but later on, she's orange while her headset turns red. From series 6, her headset is red with coloured stars. Phoebe answers calls, takes messages, and speaks various languages. Phoebe was voiced by 4 different voice actors during the ITV series run.
 Filbert (ITV Series 1–5 only) – a squeaking vegetable and a fellow trainee wizard. He is also regularly seen gardening. He was born from a seed in the first ITV series and at first Wizadora had no idea as to who he was. He loves to water the plants and is best  friends with Tatty. In the first season, Filbert talked in gibberish as he was still learning how to speak,  and in later series, English as the character develops. Filbert often got himself into trouble, although meaning well. He is very kind-hearted and is always offering to help out Wizardora or Tatty. In Season 5, he leaves Wizardora's place to start a new life independently as shown in the episode "Filbert's New House".
 Dog Doormat – a barking doormat (Only seen in the first ITV series)
 Hangle – a purple coat hanger (but who insists on calling himself a cloak hanger) with a yellow rain coat, glasses and a purple moustache. Has quite an obsession with cleaning. For instance, in the episode 'Hangle's big day' he locks everyone out in the garden because he thinks they are too untidy. As a result, he ends up hurting his back due to being too stubborn. He has a crude sense of humour and is also quite bossy. In the first episode of Series 1, Hangle introduces himself as "Cliff Hangle, cloak hanger extraordinaire".
 Very Old Fish – a cryptic talking male fish who told stories about his life. 
 Poot (ITV Series 2 onwards)– Wizadora's computer. Poot was often used to help with Wizadora's questions. For series 2 and 3 Poot was green and flat shaped. In the later series he changed to a more computer like machine with a pale orange face. 
 Nigel the Snail- (ITV series Two onwards) A blue snail who lives with Very Old Fish.
 The Crows (series 3 onwards) – Boris and his brother Horace cause mayhem for Tatty Bogle in the garden.
 Roxy – a quite friendly talking spider who lives in Tatty's tree house. (Introduced in 1996)
 Dusty – A creature who lives under the fridge, he has a very loud operatic voice and is usually sleeping (seen in the first series for ITV and again in series 6)
 Tom and Katie- (Oxford series only) Two children who lived near Wizadora. Not seen in the ITV series. Played by Harriet Carmichael and Adam Johnstone.
One episode of Wizadora was broadcast on CITV on Saturday, 5 January 2013 (the show's 20th anniversary) as part of a CITV anniversary special. This was the first time the show has been broadcast in the UK since it was shown on Living TV in the early 2000s. Episodes from the first ITV series are now showing on BritBox as of July 2020.

Other cast and credits 
Puppeteers Phil Eason, Francis Wright, Michael Bayliss, Sue Dacre, Don Austen, Brian Herring, Neil Sterenberg, Rebecca Nagan, Debbie Cumming, and Sheila Clark worked on the series.

The ITV series was made for Meridian Broadcasting by production companies Workhouse and North Pole Productions at The Fountain Studios in New Malden and directed by David Crozier. Fifteen episodes of Series 3 were directed by Wendy J. Dyer. The theme music was composed by Dave Hutton who was also the Senior Cameraman on the first four series of the show. The theme tune for the ITV series was recorded at Gordon Thrussell's studios at Ashford in Kent and the credits show music by 'Hutt and Thrust'. This was because the director, David Crozier, did not want the same name for two different credits on the programme (i.e.: Snr Cameraman and Music). The other cameramen were Roger Backhouse, and Angus Macmillan and sometimes Steve Leach. The vision mixer was Julie Miller.

Transmission guide

 
One episode of Wizadora was broadcast on CITV on Saturday, 5 January 2013 (the show's 20th anniversary) as part of a CITV anniversary special. This was the first time the show has been broadcast in the UK since it was shown on Living TV in the early 2000s. As of June 2020, episodes from Series One are now showing on BritBox in the UK.

Oxford Series (1991)
Phoebe Calling - 15 September 1991
A Red Banana - 22 September 1991
Happy Birthday - 29 September 1991
The Magic Cloak - 6 October 1991
Can You Fly? - 13 October 1991
Where Is Katie? - 20 October 1991
The Picnic - 27 October 1991
Hangle Is Lost - 3 November 1991

Series 1 (1993)
The Magic Parcel - 5 January 1993
Time For Tidying - 12 January 1993
Hello Filbert - 19 January 1993
A Colourful Day - 26 January 1993
Lovely Weather - 2 February 1993
Picnic Problems - 9 February 1993
Mops & Bicycles - 16 February 1993
Hangle In Charge - 23 February 1993
A Very Special Day - 2 March 1993
Wellingtons & Snails - 9 March 1993
The Purple Powder - 16 March 1993
Tea Time Troubles - 23 March 1993
The Octocleaner - 30 March 1993
Wand & Superwand - 6 April 1993
Eggs & Bicycles - 13 April 1993
Tricky Things Umbrellas - 20 April 1993
Autumn Laughter - 27 April 1993
Firework Party - 4 May 1993

Series 2 (1993)
Poot Saves The Day - 6 September 1993
A Change for Filbert - 8 September 1993
A Good Day For Sun - 13 September 1993
Just Your Imagination - 15 September 1993
The Thingummy Jig - 20 September 1993
Where Was I - 22 September 1993
I Smell A Smell - 27 September 1993
The Squeaking Door - 29 September 1993
Magical Music - 4 October 1993
She's So Wizadorable - 6 October 1993
I Spy - 11 October 1993
Cheer And Tears - 13 October 1993
Round And Round The Garden - 18 October 1993
Eat Well Stay Well - 20 October 1993 
Look Before You Leap - 25 October 1993
Easy As One Two Three - 27 October 1993
Strangers Among Up - 1 November 1993
Five Carrot Pie - 4 November 1993
Something Old Something New - 8 November 1993
Be Careful Wizadora - 11 November 1993
Soft, Strong, Brittle And Weak - 15 November 1993
Coughs And Sneezes - 18 November 1993
No More Please - 22 November 1993
Who Needs Elbows - 25 November 1993
Mine All Mine - 29 November 1993
A Use For Everything - 1 December 1993
To Have And To Have More - 6 December 1993
Peace And Quiet - 8 December 1993
A Matter Of Suze - 13 December 1993
Good Friends - 15 December 1993
The Number Spell - 20 December 1993
Christmas Day 22 December 1993

Series 3 (1994)
A Message from Max - 7 September 1994
Pips and Plants - 8 September 1994
Sneezeberries - 14 September 1994
Too Big, Too Small - 15 September 1994
Bubble Trouble - 21 September 1994
A Sing Song For Stan - 22 September 1994
Sixies and Nines - 28 September 1994
All Together Now - 29 September 1994
I Smell a Lie - 5 October 1994
Pippa's Surprise - 6 October 1994
Cheer Up, Filbert! - 12 October 1994
Let's Dance! - 13 October 1994
The Shopping List - 19 October 1994
Tatty's Tablecloth - 20 October 1994
The Tantrum Spell - 26 October 1994
The Great Flood - 27 October 1994
Buttons and Holes - 2 November 1994
The Litter Spell - 3 November 1994
Fun With Books - 9 November 1994
No Time for Tea Time - 10 November 1994
Hard, Soft, Smooth & Rough - 16 November 1994
The Grabber - 17 November 1994
Pedal Power - 23 November 1994
The Mud Monster - 24 November 1994
Wool Trouble - 30 November 1994
Pots and Spells - 1 December 1994
That's What Friends Are For - 7 December 1994
A Stuck Sticky - 8 December 1994
Use Your Imagination - 14 December 1994
Beginnings and Endings - 15 December 1994

Series 4 (1995)
Beside the Seaside - 5 September 1995
Sounds Brilliant - 7 September 1995
Bless You! - 12 September 1995
You Can Count on Poot - 14 September 1995
Follow That Track! - 19 September 1995
Here's One We Made Earlier - 21 September 1995
Who's Afraid of the Dark? - 26 September 1995
Good Winners and Bad Losers - 28 September 1995
Communication Break Down - 3 October 1995
Snow in July - 5 October 1995
Making Pippa Strong - 10 October 1995
Glad Rags - 12 October 1995
Shape Up - 17 October 1995
Hangle Takes A Trip - 19 October 1995
Mirror, Mirror - 24 October 1995
Tatty's New Boots - 26 October 1995
Inside Out - 31 October 1995
Stan's the Man - 2 November 1995
I Spy With My Little Eye - 7 November 1995
Filbert's New House - 9 November 1995
Top of the List - 14 November 1995
It's a Good Job - 16 November 1995
Shadow Monsters - 21 November 1995
Boots, Beads and Beards - 23 November 1995
Watch Out Below - 28 November 1995
Sharing Magic - 30 November 1995
Big 'Uns and Little 'Uns - 5 December 1995
Sticky Moments - 7 December 1995
Too Full - 12 December 1995
Making and Breaking - 14 December 1995
First Things First - 19 December 1995
Fish Alive - 21 December 1995

Series 5 (1996)
Tatty Town - 10 September 1996
Wizadora Plays Football- 12 September 1996
Drawer People Behaving Badly - 17 September 1996
Aunt Dora's Parcel - 19 September 1996
Bottom Gets Lost - 24 September 1996
What Did You Say - 26 September 1996
The Music Spell - 26 September 1996
Take Care - 1 October 1996
Something Fishy - 3 October 1996
Wizadora's Bad Dream - 8 October 1996
Episode  - 10 October 1996
Sentimental Journey - 15 October 1996
I’m In Charge - 17 October 1996
What’s Yours Is Mine - 22 October 1996
What About Me - 24 October 1996
Hurry Up - 29 October 1996
Jungle Fever - 31 October 1996
Things That Go Bump In The Night - 5 November 1996
Old Habits Die Hard - 7 November 1996
A Moving Story - 12 November 1996
Roxy’s Web - 14 November 1996
Stan's Difficult Day - 19 November 1996
Bending The Rules - 21 November 1996
Safety Last - 26 November 1996
Stan’s Difficult Day - 28 November 1996
Hangle's Big Day - 3 December 1996
A Rainy Day - 5 December 1996
Knit Twit - 10 December 1996
The Jealous Queen - 12 December 1996
Down Goes Top - 17 December 1996
Goodbye Wizadora - 19 December 1996

Series 6 (1997)
The Paper Chase - 7 January 1997
Crow Overboard - 9 January 1997
If We Could Be Giants - 14 January 1997
The Strange Parcel - 16 January 1997
Double Trouble - 21 January 1997
Cheese Tasting Tuesday - 23 January 1997
Sticking Together - 28 January 1997
The Wish Spell - 30 January 1997
A Night Out - 4 February 1997
Tatty's Birthday Surprise - 6 February 1997
The Upside Down Spell - 11 February 1997
The Wrong Cloak - 13 February 1997
No Doughnut For Breakfast - 2 September 1997
Down Goes Top - 4 September 1997
The Mystery Box - 9 September 1997
Wizadora Gives Up - 11 September 1997
The Helpful Spell - 16 September 1997
Dream - 18 September 1997
A Promise Is A Promise- 23 September 1997
Collecting Crows - 25 September 1997
Welcome Back Tatty - 30 September 1997
Friends - 2 October 1997
Arty Party - 7 October 1997
The Strange Spell - 9 October 1997
Tiny Troubles - 14 October 1997
Tottie Bagel - 16 October 1997
Wizadora Shrinks - 21 October 1997
Who Is Important - 23 October 1997
GGG-Gosts - 28 October 1997
The Old Switcheroo - 30 October 1997
The Mischievous Spell  - 4 November 1997
We Should Be So Lucky - 6 November 1997
The Magic Carpet - 11 November 1997
Wizadora's Bad Day - 13 November 1997
No More Miss Mice Wiz - 18 November 1997
Rhyme Times - 20 November 1997
Plant Power - 25 November 1997
The Talent Contest - 27 November 1997
A Quick Snack - 2 December 1997
Wizadora Disappears - 4 December 1997
Sing Sing Sing - 9 December 1997
The Useful Spell - 11 December 1997
Wizadora's Christmas Carol Part 1 – 16 December 1997
Wizadora's Christmas Carol Part 2 – 18 December 1997
Hangle's Got Chicken Pox - 6 January 1998
Episode 026 - 8 January 1998
A Right Pain - 13 January 1998
No Place Like Home - 15 January 1998
One Is Fun - 20 January 1998
Future Shop - 22 January 1998
Good Food Bad Food - 27 January 1998
Exciting Times - 29 January 1998

Home video and DVD
The earliest version of the show has been on DVD (Oxford Press). However, this is not the ITV version and is instead an educational package.

Video Collection International
Some VHS cassettes were released in the mid-1990s with episodes from series one and series three are on The Video Collection International, except for series three.

Wizadora – The Magic Parcel (14 June 1993) Includes: The Magic Parcel, Time For Tidying, and Hello Filbert.
Wizadora – A Colourful Day (26 July 1993) Includes: A Colourful Day, Lovely Weather and Picnic Problems.
Wizadora – Mops and Bicycles (16 August 1993) Mops and Bicycles, Hangle In Charge and A Very Special Day.
Wizadora – Wellingtons and Snails (1 August 1994) Wellingtons and Snails, The Purple Powder and Tea Time Troubles.
My Little Wizadora – The Magic Parcel/Time For Tidying (1 April 1996)
My Little Wizadora – Hello Filbert/A Colourful Day (1 July 1996)
My Little Wizadora – Lovely Weather / Picnic Problems (7 October 1996)
My Little Wizadora – Mops and Bicycles/Hangle In Charge (4 November 1996)

Astrion Video
Wizadora – A Message from Max’’ (3 April 1995) A Message From Max and five other storiesWizadora – Sneezeberries (3 April 1995) Sneezeberries and five other storiesWizadora – Too Big, Too Small'' (18 August 1995) Too Big, Too Small and five other stories
’’Wizadora - Sixes And Nines’’ (18 August 1995) Sixes and Nines and five other stories
’’Wizadora - Bubble Trouble’’ (18 August 1995) Bubble Trouble and five other stories

UK VHS releases

DVD releases 
 "Wizadora – Oxford DVD"
 "Wizadora – A message From Max And Other Stories"
 Wizadora – Series One, Volume One.

Revamp

In 2003, Entertainment Rights produced a 9-minute pilot for a proposed rebooted series for Channel 5's Milkshake! strand with Anne Foy as Wizadora. Although a new version of the original theme tune was used and the overall look of the set generally in keeping with the earlier version, characters were given varying makeovers, with none of the original models being used, and several new minor characters introduced. CGI and Chroma key effects featured heavily. The proposed new series was not picked up, reportedly due to it being considered too costly.

Although there are no plans for the ITV series to return, the Oxford series is still in production with episodes being repeated on SWR Television. The original Oxford series is still used today as a teaching tool for children to learn English as second language. The DVD, book, and audio tapes are still available to buy online, along with a PC-CD ROM. A free app was produced in 2016. A website was set up in 2015, though it is now defunct as of 2018. In 2016, the German SWR Television Educational Programmes set up a website featuring the series to foster use of Wizadora films and educational games in elementary schools in Germany. Free educational games based on the series have been developed since 2016 (apps for Android, iOS, and web-based for desktop computers) and are available on www.wizadora.de.

References

External links 
 Wizadora on German TV
 

1990s German television series
1991 German television series debuts
1991 German television series endings
Das Erste original programming
Südwestrundfunk
1993 British television series debuts
1998 British television series endings
1990s British children's television series
British television shows featuring puppetry
English-language television shows
ITV children's television shows
Television series by ITV Studios
Television shows produced by Meridian Broadcasting
Wizards in television
Television about magic